Attiliosa is a genus of sea snails, marine gastropod mollusks in the family Muricidae, the murex snails or rock snails.

Species
Species within the genus Attiliosa include:
 Attiliosa aldridgei (Nowell-Usticke, 1969)
 † Attiliosa arenaria Darragh, 2017 
 Attiliosa bessei Vokes, 1999
 Attiliosa bozzettii Houart, 1993
 Attiliosa caledonica (Jousseaume, 1881)
 Attiliosa edingeri Houart, 1998
 Attiliosa eosae Espinosa & Ortea, 2016
 † Attiliosa gallica Landau, Merle, Ceulemans & Van Dingenen, 2019 
 Attiliosa glenduffyi Petuch, 1993
 Attiliosa goreensis Houart, 1993
 Attiliosa houarti Vokes, 1999
 Attiliosa kevani Vokes, 1999
 Attiliosa laurecorbariae Garrigues & Lamy, 2019
 Attiliosa nodulifera (Sowerby, 1841)
 Attiliosa nodulosa (A. Adams, 1854)
 Attiliosa orri (Cernohorsky, 1976)
 Attiliosa perplexa Vokes, 1999
 Attiliosa philippiana (Dall, 1889)
 Attiliosa poeyi (Sarasúa & Espinosa, 1979)
 † Attiliosa pouweri Landau, Merle, Ceulemans & Van Dingenen, 2019 
 Attiliosa pygmaea Garrigues & Lamy, 2019
 Attiliosa ruthae Houart, 1996

References

 
Aspellinae
Gastropod genera